Nonfiction was an avant-garde, post-punk rock band based in Ann Arbor, Michigan, United States in the late 1980s. Members included Ben Miller, Larry Miller, Bill Franks, and Doug Peterson.

Twin brothers Ben and Laurence, both guitarists, formerly of Destroy All Monsters, and brothers of Mission of Burma guitarist Roger Miller, alternated duties on bass and guitar, with each preferring to play guitar on his own compositions. Bill Franks, also known as Billi Franks, taking a spelling lesson from Jimi Hendrix, was the band's longest-term drummer, and contributed vocals and some compositions. One such composition, "I'm Not Quite Sure (what's happening right now)" was a modest commercial success, featuring Ben on a saxophone solo. Franks came to the band after it was launched with drummer Scott Petersen. Laurence and Ben once said that the only reason they played so loud was to keep level with Petersen.

The band recorded and released two albums, including the songs "Walkie Talkie", "Junkyard", and "I'm Not Quite Sure".

Musical groups from Michigan
1980s establishments in Michigan